Félix-Joseph Barrias (13 September 1822 – 24 January 1907) was a French painter.
He was well known in his day for his paintings of religious, historical or mythical subjects, but has now been largely forgotten.
Artists who trained in his studio and went on to achieve fame include Edgar Degas, Gustave Achille Guillaumet and Henri Pille.

Early years

Félix-Joseph Barrias was born on 13 September 1822 in Paris.
His brother was Louis-Ernest Barrias (1841–1905), who became a well-known sculptor.
His father was a painter on porcelain, and taught Félix-Joseph Barrias, who proved to be an adept pupil and was able to earn his own living by the age of 16.

Félix-Joseph Barrias then studied under Léon Cogniet. He won the Prix de Rome in 1844 with his picture of Cincinnatus Receiving the Deputies of the Senate. 
This let him travel to Italy for further studies.
In 1847 he exhibited at the Salon for the first time with his Young Girl Carrying Flowers and Roman Spinner.
Barrias received a third class medal in 1847 and a second class medal in 1851 for his The Exiles of Tiberius (Louvre). At the Exposition Universelle (1855) he received a second class medal for his painting Jubilee Year of 1300 in Rome.

Career
Barrias made many paintings on religious, historical or mythical subjects. He also made frescoes for the Church of Saint-Eustache, Paris, Grand Hôtel du Louvre and Chapel of Saint Genevieve in the church of Sainte-Trinité, Paris.
He was commissioned in the 1860s to contribute an illustration to an album of works on prayer compiled by William Thompson Walters, as were other noted painters of the day such as William-Adolphe Bouguereau, Jean-Léon Gérôme and James Tissot.

A large painting by Barrias was exhibited at the 1862 International Exhibition in London, depicting the French army landing in the Crimea.
In 1868 Barrias painted The Legend of the Golden Fleece on the ceiling of Drapers' Hall, London.
Barrias created mural works for the Paris Opera of Charles Garnier, and in the 1880s painted a decoration for the Mercers' Hall in London.
Barrias exhibited portraits at the Salons of 1879, 1880 and 1881. He made lithograph illustrations for Didot's editions of Virgil and Horace.

Barrias taught Edgar Degas (1834–1917) in 1853.
Other pupils included  Gustave Achille Guillaumet (1840–1884),
Fernand Pelez (1848–1913),
Étienne-Prosper Berne-Bellecour (1838–1910),
Jehan Georges Vibert (1840–1902),
Henri Pille (1844–1897), Henri Michel-Lévy (1844–1914)
and Jean-Jacques Scherrer (1855–1916).
Barrias was made a chevalier of the Legion of Honour on 12 July 1859, and an officer on 3 February 1897. He died on 24 January 1907 at the age of 84.

Reception

According to a contemporary critic, his art "is worthy of an artist who is always distinguished by a severe execution, a happy imagination, and a graceful conception of the whole effect. A painter of style, Felix Barrias has neither the solemnity nor the coldness of those who usually claim this title; very careful of the dignity of his art in these times of easy painting, he has never made a compromise with the taste of the day, and for this reason, in every essay on decorative art his name is written in advance.
However, his paintings have not stood the test of time, and he is now largely forgotten.

Selected works

 Anointing of David by Samuel (1842) – Petit Palais, Paris
 Cincinnatus Receiving the Deputies of the Senate (1844) 
 Sappho d'Ereze (1845) A photograph was published in A. Cipollini's 1890 Saffo, but the original has been lost.
 Young Girl Carrying Flowers (1847)
 A Gaul and His Daughter Imprisoned in Rome (1847)
 Roman Spinner (1847)
 The Exiles of Tiberius (1850) – purchased for the Gallery of the Luxembourg
 Michel Angelo in the Sistine Chapel (1857)
 Easter Communion (1861)
 Picardy (1863) – allegorical picture for the grand stairway of the Museum of Amiens
 The Repose (1866)
 Electra at the Tomb of her Father (1875)
 L'Homme est en mer! (1875) - subject from Victor Hugo
 Eve (1877)
 The Fairy of the Pearls (1878)
 Mont-Dore in the time of Augustus (1882)
 Death of Chopin (1885) The painting is in the National Museum, Kraków.
 The Triumph of Venus (1886)
 Camille Desmoulins in the Palais Royal (1888)

References
Citations

Sources

Grunchec, P. (1985). The Grand Prix de Rome: Paintings from the École des Beaux-Arts, 1797–1863''. Washington, DC: International Exhibitions Foundation. .

1822 births
1907 deaths
Painters from Paris
19th-century French painters
French portrait painters
French male painters
Prix de Rome for painting
Mythological painters
Officiers of the Légion d'honneur
Burials at Passy Cemetery
19th-century French male artists